The 2004 SLC Twenty20 Tournament is the 1st season of the official Twenty20 domestic cricket competition in Sri Lanka. 15 teams in total, five representing four provinces of Sri Lanka and a Sri Lanka Schools XI team participating in the competition. The competition began on 17 August 2004, when Bloomfield Cricket and Athletic Club played the Police Sports Club at Colts Cricket Club Ground, Colombo.

This season comprised eight regular matches, four quarter finals, two semi finals and a final.

Teams

Fixtures

Round 1

Knockout stage

Quarter Final 1

Quarter Final 2

Quarter Final 3

Quarter Final 4

Semi Final 1

Semi Final 2

Final

References

External links
 Tournament page – Cricinfo
 Tournament page – Cricket Archive

Domestic cricket competitions in 2007–08
Inter-Provincial Twenty20
2007 in Sri Lankan cricket
2008 in Sri Lankan cricket